Tol-e Tall (also Romanized as Toltal) is a village in Hayat Davud Rural District, in the Central District of Ganaveh County, Bushehr Province, Iran. At the 2006 census, its population was 170, in 37 families.

References 

Sattar khorrami 

Populated places in Ganaveh County